Eager Lips is a 1927 silent film romantic drama directed by Wilfred Noy and starring Pauline Garon, Betty Blythe and Gardner James. The producer was I.E. Chadwick.

Cast
Pauline Garon - Mary Lee
Betty Blythe - Paula
Gardner James - Bill Armstrong
Jack Richardson - Tony Tyler
Evelyn Selbie - Miss Lee
Fred Warren - Clancy
Erin La Bissoniere - Charmonta

Preservation status
The film is preserved in the Library of Congress collection.

References

External links
 Eager Lips at IMDb.com

1927 films
American silent feature films
Films directed by Wilfred Noy
American black-and-white films
American romantic drama films
1927 romantic drama films
1920s American films
Silent romantic drama films
Silent American drama films
1920s English-language films
English-language romantic drama films